Amiraddin Masud Nakhchivani – was an architect of the twelfth century and a representative of the Architectural school of Nakhchivan.

Amiraddin Masud Nakhchivani lived in a palace of the Eldiguzids and was the follower of the architectural style of Ajami Nakhchivani. He constructed both religious and public buildings. He also had poetical abilities, too.

References

People from the Nakhchivan Autonomous Republic
12th-century births
Year of death missing